In enzymology, a 2alpha-hydroxytaxane 2-O-benzoyltransferase is an enzyme that catalyzes the chemical reaction

benzoyl-CoA + 10-deacetyl-2-debenzoylbaccatin III  CoA + 10-deacetylbaccatin III

Thus, the two substrates of this enzyme are benzoyl-CoA and 10-deacetyl-2-debenzoylbaccatin III, whereas its two products are CoA and 10-deacetylbaccatin III.

This enzyme belongs to the family of transferases, specifically those acyltransferases transferring groups other than aminoacyl groups.  The systematic name of this enzyme class is benzoyl-CoA:taxan-2alpha-ol O-benzoyltransferase. This enzyme is also called benzoyl-CoA:taxane 2alpha-O-benzoyltransferase.  This enzyme participates in diterpenoid biosynthesis.

References

 

EC 2.3.1
Enzymes of unknown structure